Ryan Adams (born 1974) is an American singer-songwriter, record producer, and poet.

Ryan Adams may also refer to:
 
 Ryan Adams (album), his eponymous 2014 studio album
 Ryan Adams (baseball) (born 1987), American former professional baseball second baseman
 Ryan Adams (cricketer) (born 1993), English cricketer

See also
 Bryan Adams (disambiguation)